Philip Ernest Pottinger (born 29 April 1967), known professionally as Phillip Leo, is a British reggae singer, songwriter and producer. He is the last of five children from South London who were born to Jamaican parents.

Biography 
Born in Greenwich, he played in the Sir Roger Manwood's School's steel band, and learned drums and keyboard. In February 1988 Phillip Leo signed with UK label Fashion Records as a singer/songwriter. By September of that year he had reached No. 6 in the UK Reggae Charts with his first single, "Rocking the Night Away"/"Food of Love".

Leo went on to establish himself as songwriter/producer, with a string of reggae hits by other Fashion acts, including the no. 1 hit single "Two Timing Lover" by Janet Lee Davis, "Crazy Feeling" by Peter Spence, "Lets Show the World" by Nerious Joseph, and producing the lovers duo Zuruchi's first single "Celebrate Our Love", winning Reggae Songwriter of the Year two consecutive years in row in 1989 and 1990. Leo also did sessions on drum programming, keyboards and backing vocals on a string of recordings by artists like Barry Boom, Nerious Joseph, and Cutty Ranks, and also producing two songs for the Sandra Cross album Foundation Of Love.

As an artist in his own right, Leo reached no. 2 with "I Wanna be Loved by You". He then produced the hit singles "Why do Fools Fall in Love", "Good Thing Going", and "Young, Gifted & Black", which were duets with DJ CJ Lewis. His debut album in January 1990, entitled Lover of Music, which included nine of his own original compositions, reached no. 3 in the Reggae Album Chart and featured top ten reggae singles "I'm Missing You", "We Belong Together" (duet with Marie Dawn) and debut single "Rocking The Night Away".

Leo began a writing partnership with bassist/songwriter Steve Bingham and together they wrote over 170 songs. This led to them forming the Breakin’ Loose record label. The first single entitled "Hypnotic Love", which included four entirely different mixes of the song featuring DJ CJ Lewis, and spent seven weeks at no. 1 in the UK Reggae Charts in 1993. "Hypnotic Love" remained in the chart for six months. This was followed by the single "Today", which had the same format of four mixes and was also the title track of his second album. "Today" reached no. 5 in the UK Reggae Chart and showcased the different genres Leo had expanded into, side A featured songs in the Soul/R & B genre while side B stayed within the reggae/lovers rock genres which Leo was known for.

After a string of releases, Leo was approached by EMI Records. He then signed as a recording artist. This led to two top 75 UK Singles Chart positions with "Second Chance" (no. 57) and "Thinking About Your Love" (no. 64) which featured the DJ Top Cat on the street versions. Whilst he was with EMI Records, Leo produced CJ Lewis’ album, Dollars, recorded for MCA Records, from which he had a no. 3 with "Sweet's for My Sweets", and another two consecutive releases which reached the UK top twenty in the UK Singles Chart. The album went on to sell over 500,000 copies worldwide. Lewis's second album, Rough & Smooth, again produced by Leo, went platinum in Japan, and had a no.1 single taken from it called "R to the A" in France and sold over 1,000,000 copies worldwide. Leo then got his own record company Sharma Productions back on the road. His next release his third album entitled Just 4 U. The first single from the album, "Angel Heart"/"I Wanna be the One", sparked a lot of interest especially in Japan. This led to being asked to appear alongside other British and Jamaican reggae acts on Japansplash, a yearly event which takes place in different towns across Japan over the course of six weeks.

In 1997, a limited release of Phillip Leo's fifth album Down 2 Earth was circulated, from which the top ten reggae single "Summer Girl" featuring Glamma Kid was taken. Leo also embarked on more music production and remixing for other artists including Louchie Lou & Michie One, Carroll Thompson, Jack Radics, Japanese DJ Nahki, Judy Cheeks, Sean Mcguire, Musical Youth, Charlene Smith, Awesome, and Rick Clarke.

In May 2017, Leo's seventh album, Faithfully was released; the first single off the album was "Feel So Good" and the second was "Your Life". Space Dub 2 is a follow up to Space Dub originally released in 1996. Just 4 U, Down 2 Earth and Space Dub have been reissued and remastered for digital download.

Discography

Albums

Singles and EPs

Remix releases

References

External links 
 Phillip Leo at discogs.com
 Big Lion Productions

1967 births
English reggae musicians
Living people
British male singer-songwriters
21st-century Black British male singers
English record producers
English people of Jamaican descent
20th-century Black British male singers